'Aly Abdou (born October 2, 1984) is a sustainability ambassador and environmental activist holding five world records; Aly's activities aim to raise awareness and accelerate the development process by connecting people with development efforts and Initiatives in a unique way.

Aly is the founder of The Ride To 2030 initiative. He is the first Arab to achieve a world record on a motorcycle and the First Arab to achieve a world record on an electric vehicle.

World Records 
Guinness World Records - Longest journey by electric motorcycle. The Longest journey by electric motorcycle is 12,749.82 km and was achieved by Ali Abdo Ali (Egypt), across Egypt, from 10 October till 8 November 2022.
Guinness Longest journey by electric motorcycle a single country (individual). The longest journey by electric motorcycle a single country (individual) is 9,759.67 Km and was achieved by ِِAli Abdo Ali (Egypt), across Egypt, from 10 October till 31 October 2022.
Guinness World Records - Greatest distance on an electric motorcycle in 24 hours (individual). The greatest distance on an electric motorcycle in 24 hours (individual) is 919.87 and was achieved by  ِAly abdou Aly (Egypt), in New Alamain, Egypt on 17 September 2021.
Guinness World Records - Greatest distance on a motocross bike in 24 hours. The greatest distance on a motocross bike in 24 hours by an individual is 613.59 km (381.27 miles) and was achieved by Aly Abdou Aly (Egypt)  El Gouna, Egypt, on 29–30 June 2017.
 Longest Distance Traveled In Egypt By Motorcycle In Seven Days. Egypt. January 15, 2016. Ali Abdo travelled 5,864 kilometres on his motorcycle around different locations in Egypt for seven days.

References 

1984 births
Egyptian sportspeople
Sports world record holders
Long-distance motorcycle riders
Living people